St Osyth Heath is a hamlet in the Tendring district, in the county of Essex, England. 
Until the mid-1900s, The Heath was a thriving community with shops, various self-employed tradesman and The Beehive Public House.
Today all this has disappeared, with the pub now converted into an Indian Restaurant.
The Bareham family were the local butchers, whilst the Beales were hurdle and broom makers.
Both families like the rest of the community eventually moved into the main village of St Osyth.

Nearby settlements  
Nearby settlements include the large town of Clacton-on-Sea and the village of St Osyth.

Transport 
For transport there is the A133 road nearby (Little Clacton by-pass).

Hamlets in Essex
St Osyth